The Diocese of Las Cruces is a Latin Church ecclesiastical territory or diocese of the Catholic Church in the southwestern region of the United States, comprising the 10 southern counties in the state of New Mexico: Hidalgo, Grant, Luna, Sierra, Doña Ana, Otero, Lincoln, Chaves, Eddy, and Lea.  It is led by a prelate bishop which serves as pastor of the mother church, Cathedral of the Immaculate Heart of Mary, in the City of Las Cruces.  Its congregants are overwhelmingly Hispanic, mostly Mexican in descent.  The Diocese of Las Cruces is a suffragan diocese in the ecclesiastical province of the metropolitan Archdiocese of Santa Fe.

History
The Diocese of Las Cruces was canonically erected by Pope John Paul II on August 17, 1982.  Its territory was taken from the Archdiocese of Santa Fe and the Diocese of El Paso.

On November 8, 2018, the Diocese of Las Cruces released the names of 28 clergy who were "credibly accused" of committing acts of sex abuse while serving in the Diocese On February 11, 2019, the Diocese released the personnel files of all of the credibly accused clergy. 13 more clergy and a volunteer teacher were added to the credibly accused list as well. On May 8, 2020, it was revealed that the Diocese of Las Cruces was facing a major sex abuse lawsuit involving former priest David Holley, who was accused of committing the alleged sex abuse in the 1970s, and two parishes in Alamogordo. Holley was convicted in New Mexico in 1993 and given a 55 to 275 year prison sentence.

Bishops
The list of bishops of the diocese and their years of service:
 Ricardo Ramirez (1982–2013)
 Oscar Cantú (2013–2018), appointed Bishop of San Jose
 Peter Baldacchino (2019–present)

Education

Las Cruces Catholic School (k-8)

See also

 Catholic Church by country
 Catholic Church in the United States
 Ecclesiastical Province of Santa Fe
 Global organisation of the Catholic Church
 List of Roman Catholic archdioceses (by country and continent)
 List of Roman Catholic dioceses (alphabetical) (including archdioceses)
 List of Roman Catholic dioceses (structured view) (including archdioceses)
 List of the Catholic dioceses of the United States

References

External links
Roman Catholic Diocese of Las Cruces Official Site

 
Diocese of Las Cruces
Christian organizations established in 1982
Las Cruces
1982 establishments in New Mexico
Las Cruces